Myenty Abena (born 12 December 1994) is a Surinamese professional footballer who plays for Ferencváros as a centre back.

Club career
He made his professional debut in the Eerste Divisie for Jong FC Utrecht on 26 August 2016 in a game against Jong PSV.

Spartak Trnava
In January 2019, Abena joined a Slovak side Spartak Trnava, domestic reigning champions.

On 1 May 2019, Abena won the Slovak Cup with Spartak Trnava, scoring the last penalty in the penalty shoot-out, after the match ended up 3–3 after extra–time.

Slovan Bratislava
In June 2019, Abena signed a 4–year contract with Slovan Bratislava, the main rivals of his previous employer.

In the 2019–20 season, he completed the domestic double with Slovan by winning the Slovak Super Liga and Slovak Cup. He remained part of the team, which had repeated the double in the following season.

International career
In October 2020 Abena became eligible to represent Suriname internationally. He made his debut on 24 March 2021 in a World Cup qualifier against the Cayman Islands.

Honours
Spartak Trnava
Slovnaft Cup: 2018–19

Slovan Bratislava
Fortuna Liga: 2019–20, 2020–21, 2021–22
Slovnaft Cup: 2019–20, 2020–21

References

External links
 
 

1994 births
Sportspeople from Paramaribo
Surinamese footballers
Suriname international footballers
Dutch footballers
Surinamese emigrants to the Netherlands
Living people
Association football defenders
FC Utrecht players
Jong FC Utrecht players
De Graafschap players
Eredivisie players
Eerste Divisie players
FC Spartak Trnava players
ŠK Slovan Bratislava players
Ferencvárosi TC footballers
Slovak Super Liga players
Surinamese expatriate footballers
Dutch expatriate footballers
Expatriate footballers in Slovakia
Expatriate footballers in Hungary
Dutch expatriate sportspeople in Slovakia
Surinamese expatriate sportspeople in Slovakia
Surinamese expatriate sportspeople in Hungary